Donald Lachlan Pyke (born 5 December 1968) is a former Australian rules footballer who is an assistant coach at the Sydney Swans. He was formerly the senior coach of the Adelaide Football Club in the Australian Football League (AFL). He played for the West Coast Eagles from 1989 to 1996.

Pyke was the first United States born player in the Australian Football League and played more games and kicked more goals than any other American born player in the history of the league with 132 games and 97 goals. Pyke was recruited by the Claremont Football Club for the 1987 WAFL season, playing in a premiership in his first season and winning the club's best and fairest award in his second season. This led to his recruitment by West Coast, who selected him prior to the 1988 National Draft. Pyke spent eight seasons at the club, playing in premiership sides in both 1992 and 1994, and sharing the Club Champion Award with Glen Jakovich in 1993. 

After retiring from playing, Pyke was the senior coach of Claremont from 1999 to 2000. He became served as an assistant coach at Adelaide in 2005 and 2006, and later rejoined West Coast as a strategy coach at the end of the 2013 AFL season, under Adam Simpson. He was appointed senior coach of Adelaide in October 2015, replacing Phil Walsh. He coached the team to the 2017 AFL Grand Final, in which they were defeated by Richmond.

Early life
Pyke was born to Frank Pyke and his wife, Janet, on 5 December 1968, in Bloomington, Illinois. Pyke's other brothers, Stephen and James Pyke, who later played cricket for South Australia, had been born in Australia. Pyke and his family returned to Western Australia in 1972, after his father accepted a role at the University of Western Australia. The family again moved in 1977, to Canberra, where his father had accepted a role as Head of the Centre for Sports Studies at the University of Canberra. Pyke excelled at junior level at both football and cricket, playing for the Belconnen Football Club and representing the ACT cricket team at under-16 and under-19 level.

WAFL and cricket
He also represented the Western Australia under-19 cricket team in two matches at the 1987–88 Australian Under-19 Championships, playing alongside future Test cricketers Brendan Julian and Alan Mullally. Pyke won Claremont's best and fairest award (the E. B. Cook Medal) in 1988, playing mainly as an attacking rover.

AFL playing career

West Coast Eagles
Pyke was recruited by West Coast Eagles with a pre-draft selection in the 1988 VFL Draft. He was one of five pre-draft selections, with the others including future premiership players Peter Sumich, Craig Turley and Scott Watters. Making his debut in round one of the 1989 season, against  at the WACA Ground, Pyke played 16 consecutive games before being dropped after a nine-possession game in round 16 against . Due to injury and poor form, he only played four games in the 1990 season, under new senior coach Mick Malthouse. In the round two game against , Pyke kicked three goals, a career high. Pyke was later developed into a player more renowned for his defensive skills. He was selected to represent NSW/ACT at the 1993 State of Origin Championships. He was a member of the Eagles' Grand Final-losing side and played in both the 1992 and 1994 premiership sides. Pyke was knocked out by Gary Ablett in the early stages of the 1992 grand final, but returned to play an important role in the win. Playing mainly as a tagger, he tied with Glen Jakovich for the 1993 Club Champion Award, also earning seven Brownlow Medal votes, and was runner-up in the best and fairest to Jakovich the next year. A shoulder injury forced his premature retirement from playing in 1996, although he returned to play in Claremont's 1996 premiership side.

Pyke played for West Coast Eagles from 1989 until 1996 for a total of 132 games and kicked a total of 70 goals. Pyke was also a member of the 1992 and 1994 premiership sides.

Post-playing career and administration career
After his retirement, Pyke continued his involvement with West Coast, serving as team runner in 1997 and 1998. He would later become a director at the club from 2001 to 2004, and was rewarded with life membership in 2003.

Coaching career

Early career
In 1999, Pyke became the senior coach of Claremont until his resignation in 2000.

Adelaide Football Club assistant coach (2005–2006) 
Pyke became an assistant coach under senior coach Neil Craig at Adelaide, whom he had previously interviewed for the Eagles' job. In late 2006, Pyke resigned as Adelaide's assistant coach after two seasons to return to Western Australia, and concentrate on his business.

West Coast Eagles assistant coach (2013–2015) 
In October 2013, he was made an assistant coach at West Coast Eagles, when he returned to his old playing club under the new senior coach Adam Simpson, specialising in "strategy, stoppages, and structure".

Adelaide Football Club senior coach (2015–2019) 
On 9 October 2015, Pyke was appointed as the senior coach of the Adelaide Football Club, succeeding caretaker senior coach Scott Camporeale who succeeded  the late Phil Walsh who was murdered midway through the 2015 AFL season. The Crows made the semi-finals in his first season as coach but were defeated by the Sydney Swans. On 12 September 2019, Pyke resigned as senior coach of the Adelaide Crows. Pyke was then replaced by Matthew Nicks as senior coach of the Adelaide Football Club.

Sydney Swans assistant coach (2020–present) 
In October 2020, it was announced that Pyke would join the Sydney Swans as an assistant coach under senior coach John Longmire from the 2021 season.

Statistics

Playing statistics

|- style="background-color: #EAEAEA"
! scope="row" style="text-align:center" | 1989
|style="text-align:center;"|
| 1 || 16 || 14 || 15 || 194 || 67 || 261 || 52 || 17 || 0.9 || 0.9 || 12.1 || 4.2 || 16.3 || 3.3 || 1.1 || 0
|-
! scope="row" style="text-align:center" | 1990
|style="text-align:center;"|
| 1 || 4 || 3 || 6 || 39 || 21 || 60 || 0 || 5 || 0.8 || 1.5 || 9.8 || 5.3 || 15.0 || 0.0 || 1.3 || 0
|- style="background:#eaeaea;"
! scope="row" style="text-align:center" | 1991
|style="text-align:center;"|
| 10 || 24 || 4 || 11 || 301 || 94 || 395 || 49 || 39 || 0.2 || 0.5 || 12.5 || 3.9 || 16.5 || 2.0 || 1.6 || 0
|-
|style="text-align:center;background:#afe6ba;"|1992†
|style="text-align:center;"|
| 10 || 12 || 9 || 3 || 133 || 65 || 198 || 24 || 17 || 0.8 || 0.3 || 11.1 || 5.4 || 16.5 || 2.0 || 1.4 || 0
|- style="background:#eaeaea;"
! scope="row" style="text-align:center" | 1993
|style="text-align:center;"|
| 10 || 22 || 12 || 6 || 352 || 112 || 464 || 100 || 42 || 0.5 || 0.3 || 16.0 || 5.1 || 21.1 || 4.5 || 1.9 || 7
|-
|style="text-align:center;background:#afe6ba;"|1994†
|style="text-align:center;"|
| 10 || 25 || 13 || 10 || 392 || 114 || 506 || 98 || 48 || 0.5 || 0.4 || 15.7 || 4.6 || 20.2 || 3.9 || 1.9 || 5
|- style="background:#eaeaea;"
! scope="row" style="text-align:center" | 1995
|style="text-align:center;"|
| 10 || 21 || 15 || 6 || 255 || 111 || 366 || 50 || 37 || 0.7 || 0.3 || 12.1 || 5.3 || 17.4 || 2.4 || 1.8 || 1
|-
! scope="row" style="text-align:center" | 1996
|style="text-align:center;"|
| 10 || 8 || 0 || 1 || 64 || 36 || 100 || 19 || 13 || 0.0 || 0.1 || 8.0 || 4.5 || 12.5 || 2.4 || 1.6 || 0
|- class="sortbottom"
! colspan=3| Career
! 132
! 70
! 58
! 1730
! 620
! 2350
! 392
! 218
! 0.5
! 0.4
! 13.1
! 4.7
! 17.8
! 3.0
! 1.7
! 13
|}

Head coaching record

See also
 List of VFL/AFL players born outside Australia
 List of West Coast Eagles players

References

External links

1968 births
Living people
VFL/AFL players born outside Australia
Australian rules footballers from Western Australia
Claremont Football Club coaches
Claremont Football Club players
American emigrants to Australia
American players of Australian rules football
Adelaide Football Club coaches
Sportspeople from Bloomington, Illinois
John Worsfold Medal winners
West Coast Eagles administrators
West Coast Eagles players
West Coast Eagles Premiership players
Cricketers from Perth, Western Australia
Allies State of Origin players
Belconnen Football Club players
Two-time VFL/AFL Premiership players
Australian rules footballers from the Australian Capital Territory